Henrique Martins Pereira (born 15 February 2002) is a Portuguese professional footballer who plays as a winger for Benfica B in Liga Portugal 2.

Playing career
Pereira made his professional debut with Benfica B in a 1-1 Liga Portugal 2 tie with F.C. Porto B on 25 January 2021.

Honours
Benfica
Under-20 Intercontinental Cup: 2022

References

External links
 
 
 

2002 births
Living people
Footballers from Lisbon
Portuguese footballers
Portugal youth international footballers
Association football wingers
Liga Portugal 2 players
S.L. Benfica B players